This a list of current and former on-air staff of business news channel CNBC.

Current on-air staff

Staff are based at CNBC's headquarters in Englewood Cliffs, New Jersey unless stated otherwise.

Anchors

Reporters

Notable Contributors

Former on-air staff

Anchors and hosts
Peter Barnes (Capitol Gains; now a Washington-based bureau reporter for the Fox Business)
Maria Bartiromo (Squawk Box, Street Signs, Market Watch, Market Wrap, Business Center, Closing Bell and On the Money with Maria Bartiromo; now a Global Markets Editor and anchor of Mornings with Maria at Fox Business)
Louisa Bojesen (Street Signs; left CNBC Europe in April 2017)
Gloria Borger (Capital Report; now a Senior Political Analyst for CNN)
Erin Burnett (Squawk on the Street, Street Signs; now anchor of CNN's Erin Burnett OutFront)
Brenda Buttner (The Money Club; business correspondent for Fox News and host of Bulls & Bears; died February 20, 2017)
Michelle Caruso-Cabrera; (Worldwide Exchange, Power Lunch; left in September 2018)
Neil Cavuto (Market Wrap; now host of 3 shows, Your World with Neil Cavuto and Cavuto Live on Fox News and Cavuto: Coast to Coast on Fox Business, where he is also the Senior Vice President and Managing Editor of Business News)
Liz Claman (Morning Call, Cover to Cover, Wake Up Call, Market Watch, Today's Business, This Morning's Business, and Before the Bell; now a co-anchor at Fox Business)
Tom Costello (Today's Business; now a correspondent for NBC News)
Ted David (The Money Wheel, Market Wrap, Morning Call; retired in May 2008)
Donny Deutsch (The Big Idea with Donny Deutsch; now CEO of the advertising/marketing firm Deutsch, Inc. and MSNBC contributor)
Amanda Drury (Street Signs, Power Lunch; rejoined CNBC Asia, based in Sydney)
Michael Eisner (Conversations with Michael Eisner)
Wilfred Frost (Worldwide Exchange, Closing Bell; now with Sky News. He also occasionally presents Worldwide Exchange from CNBC Europe in London)
Melissa Francis (now an anchor at Fox Business and Fox News)
Yousef Gamal El-Din (Access: Middle East; now with Bloomberg Television based in Dubai)
Hadley Gamble (Capital Connection, Access: Middle East, Access: Africa)
Susie Gharib (Today's Business; formerly a co-anchor for the Nightly Business Report on PBS, now produced by CNBC; now working at Fortune magazine)
Bill Griffeth (Nightly Business Report, Closing Bell, Power Lunch retired in December 2019)
Charles Grodin (The Charles Grodin Show; subsequently a commentator for the CBS News Radio before passing.) 
Mark Haines (Squawk Box, Squawk on the Street; died May 24, 2011)
Richard Hart (CNET News.com; no longer active in the cable news industry)
Simon Hobbs (Squawk on the Street; left in July 2016.)
Nicolas Hulot (now a French environmentalist and is no longer active in the cable news industry)
Gregg Jarrett (Inside America's Courts; now an anchor at Fox News)
Terry Keenan (The Money Wheel and Market Wrap; left Fox News in September 2009, died October 23, 2014)
Larry Kudlow (Kudlow & Cramer, The Kudlow Report; left CNBC to become Director of the National Economic Council, now with Fox Business)
Nicole Lapin (Worldwide Exchange; left CNBC in August 2011)
 Janice Lieberman, (Steals and Deals)
Martha MacCallum (Morning Call; now co-anchor of America's Newsroom on Fox News)
Consuelo Mack (Market Watch, Morning Call, The Wall Street Journal Report, WealthTrack)
Boyd Matson (National Geographic Explorer; now host of Wild Chronicles on PBS)
Chris Matthews (The Chris Matthews Show; later host of Hardball with Chris Matthews on MSNBC)
Kevin McCullough (The Money Wheel)
John McEnroe (McEnroe; now a tennis commentator)
Dennis Miller (Dennis Miller; now a Fox News Channel contributor and talk radio show host)
Bob O'Brien (former stocks editor; now working at Barron's Magazine)
Suze Orman (The Suze Orman Show; left CNBC to develop a new series, Suze Orman's Money Wars, for Warner Bros. Telepictures Productions)
Dylan Ratigan (Closing Bell and Fast Money; left sister channel MSNBC in 2012; no longer active in the television industry)
Trish Regan (The Call; now an anchor at Fox Business)
Geraldo Rivera (Rivera Live and Upfront Tonight; now host of his own show, Geraldo at Large on Fox News)
Louis Rukeyser (Louis Rukeyser's Wall Street; died in 2006)
Tim Russert (Tim Russert; died in 2008)
John Seigenthaler (The News on CNBC; was at Al Jazeera America until its demise on April 12, 2016)
Bob Sellers (Today's Business, Market Watch; now at WZTV (Fox) in Nashville, TN and also, a talent agent for MediaStars Worldwide)
Shepard Smith (New York) (The News with Shepard Smith left CNBC in November 2022)
John Stehr (The Money Wheel; now primary anchor at WTHR in Indianapolis, Indiana)
Felicia Taylor (Before the Bell, The Money Wheel, and This Morning's Business; formerly a business correspondent for CNN, was with the Retirement Living TV network until its demise on December 31, 2017)
Brian Williams (The News with Brian Williams; was anchor of the weeknight editions of the NBC Nightly News from 2004 to 2015, rejoined MSNBC in August 2015)

Reporters and others
Kate Bohner (no longer active in the cable news industry)
Pat Bolland  (now an anchor at BNN in Canada)
Eric Bolling (former panelist on Fast Money; now host of The Five on Fox News)
Margaret Brennan (later joined to Bloomberg Television and now an anchor at CBS News)
Bay Buchanan (now a political commentator for CNN's The Situation Room)
Allan Chernoff (now Senior Correspondent at CNN)
Alina Cho (now a New York City-based bureau reporter for CNN)
Don Dahler (now a correspondent for CBS News)
Jackie DeAngelis (now an anchor for Yahoo Finance, and a reporter for Fox Business)
Diane Dimond (now a co-host for the "TalkItOver" radio program)
Phil Donahue
Dan Dorfman (was a columnist for the New York Sun until its September 2008 demise; died June 16, 2012)
Morton Downey Jr. (died in 2001)
Charles Gasparino (now with Fox Business)
Garrett Glaser (retired from broadcasting and started his own firm, Glaser Media, in 2007)
Alexis Glick (later joined Fox Business and no longer in the cable news industry)
Bianna Golodryga (now a business correspondent for CBS News)
Amanda Grove
Nanette Hansen (now a realtor in Long Island, New York; no longer active in the cable news industry)
John Harwood
Kathleen Hays (now an anchor at Bloomberg Television)
Rebecca Jarvis (now working as anchor and correspondent for ABC News)
Cory Johnson (now a San Francisco-based co-anchor at Bloomberg Television)
Kate Kelly
John "Bradshaw" Layfield (former professional wrestler for the WWE and a business contributor for Fox News, which he rejoined in 2005 after he was fired from CNBC in 2004; he is also a color commentator for WWE Raw and WWE SmackDown)
Susan Li (now reporter at Fox Business)
John McLaughlin (died August 16, 2016)
John Murphy
Dee Dee Myers (former White House Press Secretary; now a political commentator for MSNBC)
Jim Paymar (now anchor/executive producer of the Long Island Business Report at WLIW)
Hampton Pearson (retired in June 2018)
Rob Reynolds (now a correspondent for Al Jazeera English)
Al Roker (now weatherman for the Today show on NBC)
Carol Roth (Closing Bell, host of The Noon Show on WGN Radio)
Darren Rovell (now with ESPN & ABC News)
John W. Schoen (now Data Editor for CNBC Digital.)
Bill Seidman (chief commentator for CNBC; died in 2009)
Tom Snyder (died in 2007)
Mary Thompson
Joe Witte (later a weekend weather meteorologist at WJLA-TV (ABC) in Washington, D.C.; now with the Goddard Space Flight Center)
William (Bill) Wolman (most recently with Bloomberg BusinessWeek magazine; retired from broadcasting)
Carmen Rita Wong (On the Money; was most recently a radio host for Marketplace Radio on American Public Media until January 31, 2014.)

References

CNBC